Fathul Mujahidin is a military manual that was written by Zainul Abedin Shustari at the instruction of Tipu Sultan, the ruler of the Kingdom of Mysore in South India considered a pioneer in the use of rocket artillery. Mysore started to equip their army with rockets in the 1750s and during the Second Anglo–Mysore War (1780–1784) Tipu and his father Haider Ali used this technology against British troops. Tipu Sultan used rockets in battle with the British Army in the 1792 Siege of Srirangapatna, a battle at the end of the Third Anglo-Mysore War.

Tipu distributed copies of his military manual to all of his officers. In the manual he defined 200 men to handle rockets within each of the Mysore cushoons, with 16 to 24 cushoons of infantry. The personnel handling the rockets were trained to define the launch angle to properly affect the curve at which the rocket would land. Tipu also defined in the manual a multiple rocket launcher (much like a musical organ) that would launch up to 10 rockets. Some of the rockets had blades in the front of the bamboo guiding rods, while others were designed as incendiary rockets.

Although not the first use of rockets by Mysore, the 1792 Siege of Srirangapatna reportedly began with showers of as many as 2,000 rockets fired simultaneously.

According to Stephen Oliver Fought and John F. Guilmartin, Jr. in Encyclopædia Britannica (2008):

See also
Congreve rocket
Hyder Ali
Tipu Sultan
Mughal weapons

References

External links 

, focussing on Tipu Sultan and the Scots in India, 1760–1800

Military handbooks and manuals
Early rocketry
Rocket artillery
Kingdom of Mysore
Artillery of India
18th-century Indian books